Doris Lee Feigenbaum Fisher  (born August 23, 1931) is an American billionaire businesswoman who co-founded The Gap clothing stores with her late husband, Donald Fisher in 1969.

Early life
Born Doris Lee Feigenbaum in San Francisco, California to a Jewish family in 1931, she is the daughter of Dorothy Bamberger of New York and B. Joseph Feigenbaum. She had two siblings: Ann F. Rossi and Joseph L. Feigenbaum.

Career
Fisher is a noted art devotee. She loaned the collection she and her husband spent their lives collecting, which consists of 1,100 works by 185 artists, including Andy Warhol, Ellsworth Kelly, and Richard Serra, to the San Francisco Museum of Modern Art, which, because of her support, is now the largest modern art museum in the United States.

She has been named as one of the 100 Most Powerful Women by Forbes Magazine. She has served as a trustee of Stanford University, her alma mater.

Political views

In 2019, it was revealed that Doris, together with her sons Robert J. Fisher, William S. Fisher, and John J. Fisher, had donated nearly $9 million to Americans for Job Security, a non-profit group that opposed Barack Obama in the 2012 election.

Personal life
She was married to Don Fisher. Their three sons – Robert J. Fisher, William S. Fisher, and John J. Fisher – continue to manage the business.

References

1931 births
Living people
American billionaires
American businesspeople in retailing
20th-century American Jews
American women business executives
Businesspeople from the San Francisco Bay Area
Retail company founders
American women company founders
American company founders
20th-century American businesspeople
Stanford University trustees
Female billionaires
Fisher family
Gap Inc. people
20th-century American businesswomen
21st-century American Jews
21st-century American women